Rhinodicynodon is an extinct genus of dicynodont therapsid of the Middle Triassic (Anisian) Donguz Formation of European Russia.

See also 
 List of therapsids

References

External links 
 The main groups of non-mammalian synapsids at Mikko's Phylogeny Archive

Dicynodonts
Anisian life
Triassic synapsids of Europe
Triassic Russia
Fossils of Russia
Fossil taxa described in 1970
Anomodont genera